Mitja Kosovelj (born 16 August 1984) is a Slovenian male mountain runner, twice world champion at the World Long Distance Mountain Running Championships (2011, 2013).

Biography
Mitja Kosovelj won Dolomites SkyRace in 2016.

References

External links
 

1984 births
Living people
Slovenian male long-distance runners
Slovenian male mountain runners
World Long Distance Mountain Running Championships winners